Prospect Township is a township in Butler County, Kansas, USA.  As of the 2000 census, its population was 2,033. It is where El Dorado Correctional Facility, a maximum security prison, is located.

History
Prospect Township was organized in 1872.

Geography
According to the USGS, it contains four cemeteries: Economy, Foster, Pontiac and Sherman. The streams of Bemis Creek, Bird Creek, Harrison Creek, Lower Branch, Satchel Creek, Shady Creek and Upper Branch run through this township.

Transportation
Prospect Township contains one airport or landing strip, Patty Field.

Further reading

References

 USGS Geographic Names Information System (GNIS)

External links
 City-Data.com

Townships in Butler County, Kansas
Townships in Kansas